Carmen Maria Machado (born July 3, 1986) is an American short story author, essayist, and critic best known for Her Body and Other Parties, a 2017 short story collection, and her memoir In the Dream House, which was published in 2019 and won the 2021 Folio Prize. Machado is frequently published in The New Yorker, Granta, Lightspeed Magazine, and other publications. She has been a finalist for the National Book Award and the Nebula Award for Best Novelette. Her stories have been reprinted in Year's Best Weird Fiction, Best American Science Fiction & Fantasy, Best Horror of the Year, The New Voices of Fantasy, and Best Women's Erotica.

Early life
Carmen Maria Machado was born July 3, 1986 in Allentown, Pennsylvania. Machado's paternal grandfather left Santa Clara, Cuba for the United States when he was 18, gaining U.S. citizenship after serving in the Korean War. He worked in the United States Patent Office and met his future wife when she immigrated to the U.S. from Austria after World War II.

Machado grew up in a very religious United Methodist household; this upbringing, she says, led to a sense of guilt about her professed queer sexuality for several years.

Education
She attended Parkland High School in South Whitehall Township, Pennsylvania and then American University in Washington, D.C., graduating in 2008.

She earned an MFA from the Iowa Writers' Workshop and received fellowships and residencies from the Michener-Copernicus Foundation, the Elizabeth George Foundation, the CINTAS Foundation, the Speculative Literature Foundation, the University of Iowa, Yaddo, Hedgebrook, and the Millay Colony for the Arts. Machado also attended the Clarion Workshop, where she studied under author Ted Chiang and others.

Career
Machado worked in the Iowa Writers' Workshop for two years after receiving her MFA there. After a rejection from Starbucks in 2013, she took up work at Lush, a soap store, while she taught writing as an adjunct professor at Rosemont College and other schools in the area. She also did freelance writing while she lived in Pennsylvania.

Machado's short stories, essays, and criticism have been published in a number of magazines including The New Yorker, Granta, The Paris Review, Tin House, Lightspeed Magazine, Guernica, AGNI, National Public Radio, Gulf Coast, Los Angeles Review of Books, Strange Horizons, and other publications. Her stories have also been reprinted in anthologies such as Year's Best Dark Fantasy & Horror 2017, Year's Best Weird Fiction, Best American Science Fiction & Fantasy, Best Horror of the Year, and Best Women's Erotica. Machado's short story "Horror Story," originally published in Granta in 2015, details a lesbian couple's difficulty coping with a haunting in their new house.

Machado's fiction has been called "strange and seductive", and it has been said that her "work doesn't just have form, it takes form." Her fiction has been a finalist for the Nebula Award for Best Novelette, the Shirley Jackson Award, the Franz Kafka Award in Magic Realism, the storySouth Million Writers Award, and the Calvino Prize from the Creative Writing Program at the University of Louisville. An analysis by Io9 indicated that if not for the Sad Puppies ballot manipulation campaign, Machado would have been a finalist for the 2015 John W. Campbell Award for Best New Writer. In 2018, she won the Bard Fiction Prize.

Her horror-inspired short story collection, Her Body and Other Parties, was published by Graywolf Press in 2017. It was a 2017 finalist for the National Book Award for fiction, won the 2017 National Book Critics Circle Award John Leonard Prize, and was shortlisted for the 2018 Dylan Thomas Prize. The collection has been optioned by FX and a television show is in development by Gina Welch.

As of 2018, she is the Writer in Residence at the University of Pennsylvania. Machado is a 2019 recipient of a Guggenheim fellowship. She was a Visiting Associate Professor at the Iowa Writers' Workshop in Spring 2021.

Machado was Guest Editor of the Best American Science Fiction and Fantasy 2019 edition. Her sci-fi short stories have appeared in volumes including Latinx Rising: An Anthology of Latinx Science Fiction and Fantasy edited by Matthew David Goodwin with an introduction by Frederick Luis Aldama.

Her essay "Both Ways", about Jennifer's Body, is part of the anthology It Came from the Closet: Queer Reflections on Horror, published in October 2022.

Personal life
Machado is queer, and lived in Philadelphia with her wife Val Howlett, though they are now separated.

Awards and honors 
 Bard Fiction Prize 
 National Book Critics Circle's John Leonard Prize 
 Crawford Award 
 Shirley Jackson Award 
 Lambda Literary Award for Lesbian Fiction 
 American Booksellers Association's Indies Choice Book Awards 
 New Atlantic Independent Booksellers Association's Book of the Year 
 Bisexual Book Award for Fiction 
 Richard Yates Short Story Prize 
 Best of Philly: Writer on the Rise 
 Brooklyn Public Library Literature Prize 
 Judy Grahn Award for Lesbian Nonfiction
 Lambda Literary Award for LGBTQ Non-fiction

Bibliography

Short stories 
 "The Lost Performance of the High Priestess of the Temple of Horror" (Granta)
 "Once Upon a Time in Hollywood" (Harper's Bazaar)
 "Mary When You Follow Her" (VQR)
 "Eight Bites" (Gulf Coast)
 "Blur" (Tin House)
 "The Husband Stitch" (Granta)
 "Horror Story" (Granta)
 "Inventory" (Strange Horizons)
 "Help Me Follow My Sister into the Land of the Dead" (Lightspeed Magazine)
 "Especially Heinous" (The American Reader)
 "Mothers" (Interfictions)
 "The Book of the Dead" (BBC Radio 4)
 "Haunt" (Conjunctions)
 "A Cat, a Bride, a Servant" (Garage)
 "A Brief and Fearful Star" (Slate/Future Tense)
 "Relaxation Technique" (McSweeney's Quarterly Concern)
 "Miss Laura's School for Esquire Men" (Tin House)
 "Vacation" (Wigleaf)
 "The Old Women Who Were Skinned" (Fairy Tale Review)
 "Descent" (Nightmare Magazine)
 "My Body, Herself" (Uncanny Magazine)
 "Observations About Eggs from the Man Sitting Next to Me on a Flight from Chicago, Illinois to Cedar Rapids, Iowa" (Lightspeed Magazine)

Comics 
 The Low, Low Woods #1-6 (2019–2020)
 Bottomless (28 pages, 2019)
 Heaven on Earth (27 pages, 2020)
 The Fruiting Body (27 pages, 2020)
Einstein on the Beach (26 pages, 2020)
The Witch's Tale (27 pages, 2020)
Bells to Rest, Lambs to Slaughter (27 pages, 2020)

Books 

Especially Heinous: 272 Views of Law & Order SVU (novella, The American Reader, May 2013)
Her Body and Other Parties (story collection, Graywolf Press, 2017; Shirley Jackson Award winner, single-author collection) 
In the Dream House (Graywolf Press, 2019) – Rathbones Folio Prize 2021
The Low, Low Woods (DC Comics, 2020)

References

External links

 
 

Living people
American science fiction writers
American women short story writers
Hispanic and Latino American short story writers
LGBT people from Pennsylvania
LGBT Hispanic and Latino American people
Lambda Literary Award for Lesbian Fiction winners
21st-century American short story writers
21st-century American women writers
Weird fiction writers
Writers from Allentown, Pennsylvania
1986 births
Parkland High School (Pennsylvania) alumni
American University alumni
Iowa Writers' Workshop alumni
21st-century American LGBT people
American lesbian writers